The  1993 Campeonato Argentino de Rugby   was won by selection of Tucumàn that beat in the final the selection of Unión de Rugby de Rosario.

Rugby Union in Argentina in 1993

National 
 Was played the first edition of National Championship for clubs, won by San Isidro Club that beat Tucumán Rugby Club in the final
 The "Campeonato Argentino Menores de 21" (Under 21 championship) was won by Cordoba
 The "Campeonato Juvenil" (Under 19 championship) was won by Buenos Aires 
 The "Torneo de la URBA" (Buenos Aires) was won by San Isidro Club
 The "Cordoba Province Championship" was won by Jockey Club Córdoba
 The North-East Championship was won by Tucumán Rugby Club

International 
 Argentina won the South American Rugby Championship, winning, as usual, all the matches. Winning that tournament, the "Pumas" obtain to play in 1994 the final of American zone of 1995 Rugby World Cup qualifying against United States.
 Argentina won both the test matches against Japan during the 1993 Japan rugby union tour of Argentina.
 Argentina lost (26-29) (23-52) both match against "Springbkos" during the 1993 South Africa rugby union tour of Argentina, the first after the end of apartheid, winning also a match against, the South African "Development" team

Torneo "campeonato" 
The better eight teams played for title. They were divided in two pools of four, the first two each pools admitted to semifinals, the last relegated in secondo division

Pool "A"

Pool "B"

Semifinals

Third place final

Final

"Ascenso" tournament

Pool C

Pool D 

Promoted: Salta
Relegated:Misiones

"Classificacion" Tournament

Pool "A" 

Promoted: Austral

Pool "B" 

Promoted: Cuenca del Salado

External links 
 Memorias de la UAR 1993
  Francesco Volpe, Paolo Pacitti (Author), Rugby 2000, GTE Gruppo Editorale (1999)

Campeonato Argentino de Rugby
Argentina
Campeonato